Zătreni is a commune located in Vâlcea County, Oltenia, Romania. It is composed of fourteen villages: Butanu, Ciortești, Dealu Glămeia, Dealu Văleni, Făurești, Mănicea, Mecea, Oltețu, Sășcioara, Stanomiru, Valea Văleni, Văleni, Zătreni and Zătrenii de Sus. Until 2004, it also included Contea, Gănești, Lăcusteni, Lăcustenii de Jos and Lăcustenii de Sus villages; these were split off that year to form Lăcusteni Commune.

Natives
 Marin Voinea

References

Communes in Vâlcea County
Localities in Oltenia